Tales of Mystery is a 2015 Chinese suspense thriller film directed by Raymond Yip, Tian Meng and Xian Xuchu. It was released on January 23, 2015.

Cast
Aarif Rahman as Zi Liang
Janice Man as Pei Wen
Zhu Zhu as Xiao Xiao
Law Lan 
Oscar Leung
Shi Yanfei as Yue Sisi
Feng Wenjuan as Zhang Xiaoyun
Yolanda Yang
Huang Ming
Michelle Hu
Lu Yulai
Lin Jiangguo

Reception
By January 23, the film had earned  at the Chinese box office.

References

2015 thriller films
Chinese thriller films
Chinese suspense films